Line 8 of the Wuhan Metro was opened on 26 December 2017 as the sixth line in the Wuhan Metro network and the third line (after Line 2 and Line 4) in the system to cross the Yangtze River.

History

Line 8 is 38.197 kilometers in length and is completed in three phases.

The first phase of Line 8, running from Jintan Road station in Hankou to Liyuan station in Wuchang, was opened on 26 December 2017.

The second phase takes a north-south alignment in Wuchang from Liyuan station to Yezhihu station opened on 2 January 2021.

The third phase, an extension lately added to previous Line 8 plans, runs from Yezhihu station to Military Athletes' Village station, intending to serve the athlete village and audiences of 2019 Military World Games. Therefore, the third phase was opened on 6 November 2019, prior to the scheduled open date of the second phase.

Stations

References

 
Railway lines opened in 2017
2017 establishments in China